Al-Zalzalah (al-zalzalah,  "The Quake") is the 99th chapter (surah) of the Qur'an, composed of 8 ayat or verses. Although it is usually classified as a Medinan surah, the period during which the surah was revealed is not unanimously agreed upon by Qur'anic exegetes. Other Abrahamic religions also support the idea of punishment to the wrongdoers like in the Day of Judgement.

Summary 
1-5 The judgment-day shall be ushered in by a declare why she trembles
6-8 Men shall be judged according to their deeds

The surah begins by describing how on the Day of Judgment, the Earth will give off a terrible earthquake and "throw up her burdens". Through the inspiration of God, the Earth will bear witness to the actions of men it has witnessed. According to Michael Sells, the earth opening up and bearing forth her secrets in this sura is indicative of a birth metaphor. The earth al-'Ard in the feminine gender bears forth of how her lord revealed the final secret to her. Human beings will then realize that the moment of accountability has arrived. This meticulous accountability will reflect good and evil deeds that might have seemed insignificant at the time.

The two concluding verses state that all men will be sorted out into groups according to their deeds, and they will see the consequence of everything they have done; every atom's weight of good or evil:

Text 

1. 

2. 

3. 

4. 

5. 

6. 

7. 

8.

Period of revelation

Whether it was revealed at Mecca or Medina is disputed. Ibn Masud, Ata, Jabir, and Mujahid say that it is a Meccan surah, and a statement of Ibn Abbas also supports this view. On the contrary, Qatadah and Muqatil say that it is Medinan, and another statement of Ibn Abbas also has been cited in support of this view. That it is a Medinan surah is reasoned from a tradition from Abu Said Khudri, which Ibn Abi Hatim has related from him. He says: "When the verse Fa-man ya mal mithqala dharratin khairan yarah, wa man ya mal mithqala dharratin sharran yarah, was revealed, I said: "O Messenger of Allah, shall I really see my deeds? The Holy Messenger replied in the affirmative. I submitted: And every major sin? He replied yes. I said: And the minor sins too? He replied yes. Thereupon I exclaimed that I would then be ruined. The Holy Prophet said: Rejoice, O Abu Sa'id, for each good act will be equal to ten good acts like it." The basis of the argument for this surah's being Madani is that Abu Sa'ld Khudri was an inhabitant of Medina and reached maturity after the Battle of Uhud. Therefore, if this surah was revealed in his presence, as is apparent from his statement, it must be a Medinan surah. However, the practice that the Companions and their immediate successors followed, in respect of the occasion of the revelation of the verses and surahs, has already been explained in the Introduction to Surah Ad-Dahr above. Therefore, a companion's saying that a verse was sent down on this or that particular occasion is no proof that it was sent down on that very occasion. It may well be that after coming of age when Abu Sa'id heard this surah for the first time from Muhammad, terrified by its last portion he might have asked Muhammad the questions which we have cited above, and he might have narrated the incident saying that when this verse was revealed he put this and this question to Muhammad. In the absence of this tradition, every reader who reads the Qur'an with understandings will feel that it is a Makki Surah. More than that: from its theme and style he would feel that it must have been sent down in the earliest stage at Makkah when the fundamental principles and beliefs of Islam were being presented before the people in a concise but highly effective way

Tafseer (Exegesis/Interpretation) 
Allah informs us about what will happen on the Day of Rising, “When the earth is violently shaken,” convulsing and rocking “with its (final) quake,” flattening all buildings and edifices, the mountains crumble and fall and the hills are flattened. The earth’s surface becomes like a barren, level plain on which you see neither dip nor gradient.[1] “And the earth disgorges its burdens,” the deceased and treasures lying within her “and man cries,” when he sees the terror that has stricken it, exclaiming “What is wrong with it?” what has happened! “On that Day it” the earth “will recount its news,” bearing witness against man for the good and evil he wrought on its surface. The earth is one of the witnesses that will be brought forward on the Day of Rising to testify for or against man., all whats hidden will be exposed! That is “because your Lord had inspired her,” ordered her to relate what was done on her surface and she will not disobey His command. “That day, man will come forward” to the Standing of the Day of Rising for Allah to judge them “in scattered groups” broken, disparate bands “to be shown their deeds,” that Allah may show them what they worked of good and evil and that He may show them His recompense. “Whoever does an atom’s weight of good will see it, and whoever does an atom’s weight of evil will see it,” this holds true for any good and any evil that was worked: if a person will see even an atoms weight and, moreover, be recompensed for it, then for sure he will see anything greater as well. Allah says, “On the Day that each self finds the good it did, and the evil it did, present there in front of it, it will wish there were an age between it and then. Allah advises you to beware of Him. Allah is Ever-Gentle with His slaves.”[2]
There are other chapters of the Quran describing this

Quran 81:1-3, 6-7
"When the sun is folded and loses its light and the stars fall; and the mountains disintegrate... and when the seas are ignited;
and the souls are rejoined with their bodies."
           
Quran 82:1-4
"When the sky cracks; and the planets scatter, and the seas explode, and the graves are overturned"

Translation of Sūrah az-Zalzalah 
In the name of Allāh, the Entirely Merciful, the Especially Merciful.1. إِذَا زُلْزِلَتِ الْأَرْضُ زِلْزَالَهَاWhen the earth is shaken with its [final] earthquake2. وَأَخْرَجَتِ الْأَرْضُ أَثْقَالَهَاAnd the earth discharges its burdens3. وَقَالَ الْإِنْسَانُ مَا لَهَاAnd man says, "What is [wrong] with it?" -4. يَوْمَئِذٍ تُحَدِّثُ أَخْبَارَهَاThat Day, it will report its news5. بِأَنَّ رَبَّكَ أَوْحَى لَهَاBecause your Lord has commanded it.6. يَوْمَئِذٍ يَصْدُرُ النَّاسُ أَشْتَاتًا لِيُرَوْا أَعْمَالَهُمْThat Day, the people will depart separated [into categories] to be shown [the result of] their deeds.7. فَمَنْ يَعْمَلْ مِثْقَالَ ذَرَّةٍ خَيْرًا يَرَهُSo whoever does an atom's weight of good will see it,8. وَمَنْ يَعْمَلْ مِثْقَالَ ذَرَّةٍ شَرًّا يَرَهُAnd whoever does an atom's weight of evil will see it.

References

External links
Quran 99 Clear Quran translation

Zalzala
Islamic eschatology